Nick Sinclair (born 3 January 1960) is an English footballer who played as a full back in the Football League for Tranmere Rovers.

References

Tranmere Rovers F.C. players
Oldham Athletic A.F.C. players
Association football fullbacks
English Football League players
Wolverhampton Wanderers F.C. players
1960 births
Living people
Footballers from Manchester
English footballers